Rapid prototyping is a group of techniques used to quickly fabricate a scale model of a physical part or assembly using three-dimensional computer aided design (CAD) data.
Construction of the part or assembly is usually done using 3D printing or "additive layer manufacturing" technology.

The first methods for rapid prototyping became available in the mid 1987 and were used to produce models and prototype parts. Today, they are used for a wide range of applications and are used to manufacture production-quality parts in relatively small numbers if desired without the typical unfavorable short-run economics. This economy has encouraged online service bureaus. Historical surveys of RP technology start with discussions of simulacra production techniques used by 19th-century sculptors. Some modern sculptors use the progeny technology to produce exhibitions and various objects. The ability to reproduce designs from a dataset has given rise to issues of rights, as it is now possible to interpolate volumetric data from 2D images.

As with CNC subtractive methods, the computer-aided-design – computer-aided manufacturing CAD -CAM workflow in the traditional rapid prototyping process starts with the creation of geometric data, either as a 3D solid using a CAD workstation, or 2D slices using a scanning device. For rapid prototyping this data must represent a valid geometric model; namely, one whose boundary surfaces enclose a finite volume, contain no holes exposing the interior, and do not fold back on themselves. In other words, the object must have an "inside". The model is valid if for each point in 3D space the computer can determine uniquely whether that point lies inside, on, or outside the boundary surface of the model. CAD post-processors will approximate the application vendors' internal CAD geometric forms (e.g., B-splines) with a simplified mathematical form, which in turn is expressed in a specified data format which is a common feature in additive manufacturing: STL file format, a de facto standard for transferring solid geometric models to SFF machines.

To obtain the necessary motion control trajectories to drive the actual SFF, rapid prototyping, 3D printing or additive manufacturing mechanism, the prepared geometric model is typically sliced into layers, and the slices are scanned into lines (producing a "2D drawing" used to generate trajectory as in CNC's toolpath), mimicking in reverse the layer-to-layer physical building process.

Application areas 
Rapid prototyping is also commonly applied in software engineering to try out new business models and application architectures such as Aerospace, Automotive, Financial Services, Product development, and Healthcare. Aerospace design and industrial teams rely on prototyping in order to create new AM methodologies in the industry. Using SLA they can quickly make multiple versions of their projects in a few days and begin testing quicker. Rapid Prototyping allows designers/developers to provide an accurate idea of how the finished product will turn out before putting too much time and money into the prototype. 3D printing being used for Rapid Prototyping allows for Industrial 3D printing to take place. With this, you could have large-scale moulds to spare parts being pumped out quickly within a short period of time.

History
In the 1970s, Joseph Henry Condon and others at Bell Labs developed the Unix Circuit Design System (UCDS), automating the laborious and error-prone task of manually converting drawings to fabricate circuit boards for the purposes of research and development.

By the 1980s, U.S. policy makers and industrial managers were forced to take note that America's dominance in the field of machine tool manufacturing evaporated, in what was named the machine tool crisis. Numerous projects sought to counter these trends in the traditional CNC CAM area, which had begun in the US. Later when Rapid Prototyping Systems moved out of labs to be commercialized, it was recognized that developments were already international and U.S. rapid prototyping companies would not have the luxury of letting a lead slip away. The National Science Foundation was an umbrella for the National Aeronautics and Space Administration (NASA), the US Department of Energy, the US Department of Commerce NIST, the US Department of Defense, Defense Advanced Research Projects Agency (DARPA), and the Office of Naval Research coordinated studies to inform strategic planners in their deliberations. One such report was the 1997 Rapid Prototyping in Europe and Japan Panel Report in which Joseph J. Beaman founder of DTM Corporation [DTM RapidTool pictured] provides a historical perspective:

"The Origins of Rapid Prototyping - RP stems from the ever-growing CAD industry, more specifically, the solid modeling side of CAD. Before solid modeling was introduced in the late 1980's, three-dimensional models were created with wire frames and surfaces. But not until the development of true solid modeling could innovative processes such as RP be developed. Charles Hull, who helped found 3D Systems in 1986, developed the first RP process. This process, called stereolithography, builds objects by curing thin consecutive layers of certain ultraviolet light-sensitive liquid resins with a low-power laser. With the introduction of RP, CAD solid models could suddenly come to life".

The technologies referred to as Solid Freeform Fabrication are what we recognize today as rapid prototyping, 3D printing or additive manufacturing: Swainson (1977), Schwerzel (1984) worked on polymerization of a photosensitive polymer at the intersection of two computer controlled laser beams. Ciraud (1972) considered magnetostatic or electrostatic deposition with electron beam, laser or plasma for sintered surface cladding. These were all proposed but it is unknown if working machines were built. Hideo Kodama of Nagoya Municipal Industrial Research Institute was the first to publish an account of a solid model fabricated using a photopolymer rapid prototyping system (1981). The very first 3D rapid prototyping system relying on Fused Deposition Modeling (FDM) was made in April 1992 by Stratasys but the patent did not issue until June 9, 1992. Sanders Prototype, Inc introduced the first desktop inkjet 3D Printer (3DP) using an invention from August 4,1992 (Helinski), Modelmaker 6Pro in late 1993 and then the larger industrial 3D printer, Modelmaker 2, in 1997. Z-Corp using the MIT 3DP powder binding for Direct Shell Casting (DSP) invented 1993 was introduced to the market in 1995. Even at that early date the technology was seen as having a place in manufacturing practice. A low resolution, low strength output had value in design verification, mold making, production jigs and other areas. Outputs have steadily advanced toward higher specification uses. Sanders Prototype, Inc. (Solidscape) started as a Rapid Prototyping 3D Printing manufacturer with the Modelmaker 6Pro for making sacrificial Thermoplastic patterns of CAD models uses Drop-On-Demand (DOD) inkjet single nozzle technology. 

Innovations are constantly being sought, to improve speed and the ability to cope with mass production applications. A dramatic development which RP shares with related CNC areas is the freeware open-sourcing of high level applications which constitute an entire CAD-CAM toolchain. This has created a community of low res device manufacturers. Hobbyists have even made forays into more demanding laser-effected device designs. 

The earliest list of RP Processes or Fabrication Technologies published in 1993 was written by Marshall Burns and explains each process very thoroughly. It also names some technologies that were precursors to the names on the list below. For Example: Visual Impact Corporation only produced a prototype printer for wax deposition and then licensed the patent to Sanders Prototype, Inc instead. BPM used the same inkjets and materials.

See also

References

Bibliography 
 Wright, Paul K. (2001). 21st Century Manufacturing. New Jersey: Prentice-Hall Inc.

External links

Product management
3D printing
Robotics
Computer-aided design
Prototypes
3D printing processes